Leilani Read (1973—1999) was a netball player who played nine times for the New Zealand national netball team and also for the Samoa national netball team. Read suffered from a rare blood disorder and died from a brain haemorrhage at the age of 25.

Career
Leilani Elizabeth Taufailematagi Read, of Samoan descent, came from Porirua in the Wellington Region of the North Island of New Zealand. She was born on 31 August 1973 and attended Wellington Girls' College from 1987 to 1991. She played netball for Wellington as a Goal shooter (GS) or Goal attack (GA), and was chosen in 1993 to play for the Silver Ferns, New Zealand's national team, making her debut in a match against Namibia held at Palmerston North, New Zealand on 15 May. She was in the New Zealand team that won a silver medal at the 1993 World Games, in The Hague, Netherlands. Dropped in 1994, she decided to play for Samoa in the 1995 Netball World Championships, which were held in Birmingham, England, where Samoa finished ninth out of 27 teams, topping its qualifying group. She rejoined the Silver Ferns in 1996.
 
Known for her cheerful and "bubbly" personality, Read was a high school teacher. She was due to play again for Samoa in the 1999 World Netball Championships in Christchurch, New Zealand, but in August 1999 she suffered a brain haemorrhage that was caused by a rare blood disorder and died on 17 August. She was buried at the Whenua Tapu Cemetery at Pukerua Bay.

References

1973 births
1999 deaths
New Zealand international netball players
Samoan netball players
New Zealand schoolteachers
New Zealand sportspeople of Samoan descent
Burials at Whenua Tapu Cemetery
Netball players from Porirua
Netball players at the 1993 World Games
1995 World Netball Championships players
People educated at Wellington Girls' College